Harvey Denison Kitchel (February 3, 1812 – September 11, 1895) was a Congregationalist minister who served as the president of Middlebury College in Middlebury, Vermont, from 1866 until 1875.

Kitchel graduated from Middlebury in 1835 and received his Doctor of Divinity in 1858. In 1865, he was awarded an honorary Master of Arts degree from Yale University.

Kitchel was the grandfather of Cornelius P. Kitchel, the mayor of Englewood, New Jersey, from 1930 to 1933. He was the great-grandfather of Denison Kitchel, a Phoenix lawyer who was the national campaign manager of U.S. Senator Barry M. Goldwater's 1964 presidential bid against Lyndon B. Johnson of Texas.

References

External links
 Kitchel Ancestry page (source for birth and death dates)

1812 births
1895 deaths
Presidents of Middlebury College
Middlebury College alumni
People from Washington County, New York
American Congregationalists
People from Middlebury, Vermont
People from East Liverpool, Ohio